Douglas Bing (27 October 1928 – 	5 February 2013) was an English footballer who played as a wing-half in the Football League for West Ham United.

Born in Broadstairs, Bing made 14 first-team appearances for Margate in 1950–51 after joining from local amateur side St. Peters Old Boys. He signed for West Ham United on 1 January 1951 after being recommended by Margate player-manager Almer Hall, who had played for the east London club before joining Margate.

Bing made his debut for West Ham on 1 September 1951, against Hull City. He was never a first-team regular at the club, making 29 Second Division appearances and scoring 3 goals, during his 4 seasons with the Hammers.

In July 1955, Bing returned to Margate. He made 39 appearances during 1955–56 and was made captain for the following campaign. He struggled with injuries for most of his second spell at Hartsdown Park, missing the entire 1957–58 season with a groin problem. After resuming training during the summer of 1958, hopes of a comeback were dashed by further injury and he was forced to retire on doctors' advice in January 1959.

References

1928 births
2013 deaths
People from Broadstairs
Footballers from Kent
English footballers
Association football wing halves
Margate F.C. players
West Ham United F.C. players
English Football League players